WMQA-FM (95.9 FM, "95.9 The Island") is an American FM radio station broadcasting an adult contemporary format. Licensed to Minocqua, Wisconsin, the station began broadcasting in 1975.

The station features news from FOX Radio Networks and programming from Westwood One. WMQA-FM uses Westwood One's Adult Contemporary format outside of the live and local morning show.

With a 22,000-watt signal, the station covers a portion of northwestern Wisconsin and some of the western Upper Peninsula of Michigan, including the Wisconsin cities of Minocqua, Rhinelander, Lac du Flambeau, Tomahawk, and Eagle River.

History
From its sign-on on April 3, 1975 until 1992, the station operated under the calls WWMH (We're Woodruff, Minocqua [and] Hazelhurst), with a mixture of MOR and country music. It would later shift to AOR music only. An AM sister station, 1570 WFBZ (later WMYM and WMQA-AM, now WLKD) was added in August 1978. In 1982, WWMH dropped AOR for Top 40. As a Top 40 station, the station was an affiliate of Casey Kasem's American Top 40 in the mid-1980s. 

In 1985, the station dropped Top 40 for its current adult contemporary format. The station changed its call letters to the current WMQA-FM in 1992, and the station had a power increase from 5,000 to 25,000 watts, with the station under the moniker "FM 96".  As an AC station, the station went by the names Soft Rock 96 and Northern Lites 96 WMQA.

On August 29, 2008, at 10 a.m., the station dropped the AC format and "Northern Lites" name to become "Oldies 95.9." The station's competition in the oldies format is WRJO-FM in Eagle River. WRJO (when local and not airing a different Classic Hits/Pop satellite feed from Westwood One) is more 1950s and 1960s oriented and WMQA's Westwood One programming leans more toward 1960s and 1970s (and some early 1980s) with a more upbeat, as well as a personality presentation.

On June 14, 2021, WMQA-FM dropped its classic hits format and returned back to its previous adult contemporary format, branded as "95.9 The Island".

Previous logo

References

External links
95.9 The Island
Mention of the format change to Kool 95.9 and audio of the format flip

Mainstream adult contemporary radio stations in the United States
MQA-FM
Radio stations established in 1975
Oneida County, Wisconsin
NRG Media radio stations